Musical Instrument Factory of Riga ( — RMIF) was the largest Soviet electronic music instrument manufacturer. It was based in Riga (former USSR, now Latvia). RMIF synthesizers became very popular among rock and pop bands in Eastern Bloc. The plant also produced drum kits. After the dissolution of the USSR in 1991, RMIF went bankrupt.

Until 1999, about 20,000 "Rīga" pianos were produced at the Riga Musical Instrument Factory. Most of them had been realized before. In the markets of the USSR and vice versa, Latvia imported pianos from other republics of the USSR ("Belorusj", "Krasnij Oktyabrj", "Ukraina", "Moskva", "Akord", "Lira", etc.). One part of the musical instruments was eliminated in the course of operation.

Products

Acoustic pianos

Acoustic drums and percussion

Electronic organ 
 RMIF Perle - Electronic organ with eleven tone stops and three effects
 RMIF Miki

Polyphonic synthesizers 
 Opus - ensemble synthesizer consists of four sections: Piano, String, Organ, and Bass
 RMIF TI-3 - polyphonic programmable synthesizer with built-in sequencer and arpeggiator
 RMIF TI-5 - polyphonic programmable synthesizer, similar to Amfiton M-028

Electronic drums 

 RMIF Elsita (ca. 1989) - analog drum modules
 RMIF ES-2-5 (1991, experimental) - analog electronic percussion with auto-rhythm

See also 
 ANS synthesizer
 Polivoks
 Theremin
 Variophone

References

External resources  
"Latvia - RIGA - Musical Instruments Factory - VF -D49307" (picture), delcampe.net
RMIF Miki (picture)

Musical instrument manufacturing companies of Latvia
Synthesizer manufacturing companies of Latvia
Electronics companies of the Soviet Union
Musical instrument manufacturing companies of the Soviet Union
Manufacturing companies based in Riga
Music in Riga